Andrés Rodales (born June 27, 1986) is a Uruguayan footballer currently playing for C.A. Rentistas in the Uruguayan Primera División.

References

External links
 
 
 

1986 births
Living people
People from Durazno Department
Uruguayan footballers
Uruguayan expatriate footballers
Liverpool F.C. (Montevideo) players
Club Atlético Tigre footballers
Atlético de Rafaela footballers
Peñarol players
Deportivo Maldonado players
Atenas de San Carlos players
C.A. Rentistas players
Uruguayan Primera División players
Uruguayan Segunda División players
Argentine Primera División players
Association football defenders
Expatriate footballers in Argentina
Uruguayan expatriate sportspeople in Argentina